The Jehu Reed House was a historic home located in Little Heaven, Kent County, Delaware.  It was built in 1771 and expanded and remodeled in 1868.  It was a three-story, five bay, brick dwelling, with a lower, three-bay rear wing containing the kitchen and servants' quarters.  The main section had a hipped roof and a Victorian porch with decorative ironwork.

It was listed on the National Register of Historic Places in 1973.

After decades of neglect, including partial collapse of the front facade, the house was demolished on July 16, 2017.

References

Houses on the National Register of Historic Places in Delaware
Houses completed in 1771
Houses in Kent County, Delaware
National Register of Historic Places in Kent County, Delaware